See-through clothing is any garment of clothing made with lace, mesh or sheer fabric that allows the wearer's body or undergarments to be seen through its fabric. See-through fabrics were fashionable in Europe in the eighteenth century. There was a  "sheer fashion trend" starting with designer clothing from 2008. See-through or sheer fabric, particularly in skintone (called "nude") colours, is sometimes called illusion, as in 'illusion bodice' (or sleeve) due to giving the impression of exposed flesh, or a revealing ensemble.

Mesh, web, or net fabric may have many connected or woven pieces with many closely spaced holes, frequently used for modern sports jerseys.

A sheer fabric is a thin cloth which is semi-transparent. These include chiffon, georgette, and gauze. Some are fine-denier knits used in tights, stockings, bodystockings, dancewear and lingerie. It can also be used in tops, pants, skirts, dresses, and gowns.

Latex rubber, which is naturally translucent, or plastics, can be made into clothing material of any level of transparency. Clear plastic is typically only found in over-garments, such as raincoats. The use of translucent latex rubber for clothing can also be found in fetish clothing. Some materials become transparent when wet or when extreme light is shone on it, such as by a flashbulb.

18th and 19th centuries

During the 1770s and 1780s, there was a fashion for wrap-over dresses which were sometimes worn by actresses in Oriental roles. These were criticised by Horace Walpole among others for resembling dressing gowns too closely, while others objected to their revealingly thin materials, such as silk gauze and muslin. In the 1780s the chemise a la Reine, as worn by Marie Antoinette in a notorious portrait of 1783 by Élisabeth Vigée Le Brun, became very popular. It was a filmy white muslin dress similar to the undergarment also called a chemise. In 1784 Abigail Adams visited Paris, where she was shocked to observe that fashionable Frenchwomen, including Madame Helvétius, favoured the more revealing and sheer versions of this gown.

By the end of the 1790s, Louis-Sébastien Mercier, observing the dress of Frenchwomen, noted that  were dressing in a manner he described as "a la sauvage", comprising a semi-sheer muslin gown worn only over a flesh-coloured bodystocking, with the breasts, arms and feet bare. Mercier blamed the public display of nude or lightly-draped statues for encouraging this immodesty.

In the very late 18th century and for the first decade of the 19th, neoclassical gowns made of lightweight translucent muslin were fashionable. As the fabric clung to the body, revealing what was beneath, it made nudity à la grecque, a centrepiece of public spectacle. The concept of transparency in women's dress was often satirised by caricaturists of the day such as Isaac Cruikshank.

Throughout the 19th century, women's dresses, particularly for summer or evening wear, often featured transparent fabrics. However, these were almost always lined or worn over opaque undergarments or an underdress so that the wearer's modesty was preserved.

Gallery

Marie Antoinette in a Muslin Dress, or Chemise a la Reine, by Vigée Le Brun
 or Absolutely no agreement by Louis-Léopold Boilly. An  is shown propositioning a woman dressed a la sauvage
1807 caricature showing an exaggeratedly transparent dress.
Portrait of Lady Elizabeth Leveson-Gower, showing a sheer gauze overdress with long sleeves over a white silk underdress.
Fashion plate showing a ball dress of sheer material over a pink underdress.
Portrait of Elena Chertkova Stroganova in a black satin dress with transparent white gauze sleeves.
Portrait of two sisters by James Tissot showing a muslin summer dress with a transparent bodice clearly showing the arms and a low-necked camisole.
The Gallery of H.M.S. Calcutta by Tissot. Summer dresses of sheer fabric, one with clearly visible low-cut back lining.
Portrait of Sonja Knips by Gustav Klimt. Afternoon dress in densely gathered sheer pink chiffon over a solid foundation lining.

20th century

1900s–1910s
In 1913 the so-called "x-ray dress", defined as a woman's dress that was considered to be too sheer or revealing, caused similar consternation. In August that year, the chief of police of Los Angeles stated his intention to recommend a law banning women from wearing the "diaphanous" x‑ray dress on the streets. H. Russell Albee, the mayor of Portland, Oregon, ordered the arrest of any woman caught wearing an x‑ray dress on the street, which was defined as a gown cut too low at the neck or split to the knee. The following year in 1914, Jean-Philippe Worth, designer for the renowned Paris couture House of Worth, had a client object to the thickness of the taffeta lining of her dress, which was described as "thinner than a cigarette paper". Worth stated that using an even thinner, sheerer lining fabric would have had the effect of an "x-ray dress".

In Australia, an article was published in The Daily Telegraph on the 24 November 1913 strongly opposed to "freak dresses" and "peek-a-boo blouses" that had lately become the fashion in "other Capitals". The editorial complains of dresses of "exiguous transparancy and undue scantiness" and "the low-cut blouse that invites pneumonia".

1960s

See-through and transparent clothing became very fashionable in the latter part of the 1960s. However, under the catwalk lights, the garments became unexpectedly transparent, revealing nude breasts beneath. The see-through look was subsequently presented by Yves Saint Laurent the following year, and in London, Ossie Clark presented sheer chiffon dresses intended to be worn without underwear. The trend led to jewellery designers such as Daniel Stoenescu at Cadoro creating "body jewellery" to be worn with sheer blouses and low-cut dresses. Stoenescu designed metal filigree "breastplates" inspired by a statue of Venus found at Pompeii, which functioned like a brassiere and were designed to be visible through the transparent shirts while preserving the wearer's modesty.

1970s
Punk rock artist Patti Smith wears a see-through slip inside-out on the cover of her 1978 album Easter.

21st century fashion

A see-through dress worn by Kate Middleton, princess of Wales, to a charity fashion show in 2002 was sold at auction on 17 March 2011 for $127,500.

See-through materials of various kinds continue to be available for a wide range of clothing styles. See-through fabrics have been featured heavily on high-fashion runways since 2006. This use of see-through fabrics as a common element in designer clothing resulted in the "sheer fashion trend" that has been predominant in fashion circles since 2008.

See also

 Bralessness
 Fetish fashion
 Fishnet
 Lace
 Plastic clothing
 Sheer fabric
 Skin-tight garment
 Stockings
 Wet T-shirt contest

References

Clothing
Fetish clothing